Brian J. Quirk (born July 11, 1968) is a former Democratic member of the Iowa House of Representatives, representing the 30th District from 2001 to 2003, and the 15th District from 2003-2012.  He received his AA from North Area Community College.  He is a veteran and served in the military from 1987-1991.

Quirk served on several committees in the Iowa House - the Agriculture, State Government, and Ways and Means committees.  He also served as ranking member of the Commerce Committee and as a member of the Transportation, Infrastructure, and Capitals Appropriations Subcommittee and of the Information Technology Council.

Quirk works at New Hampton Electric, his family's business in New Hampton.  He is a master electrician. 

On November 28, 2012, Quirk resigned his seat to take a job as the general manager of the New Hampton Municipal Light Plant.

Electoral history
*incumbent

References

External links

Representative Brian J. Quirk official Iowa General Assembly site
Brian Quirk State Representative official constituency site
 

Democratic Party members of the Iowa House of Representatives
1968 births
Living people
People from New Hampton, Iowa